Douglas B. Roberts (born October 9, 1947) served as the Treasurer of Michigan.

Early life
Roberts was born on October 9, 1947 in Washington, D.C.

Education
Roberts graduated from the University of Maryland with honors, studying economics. Roberts then earned his master's and doctorate degrees in the same subject from Michigan State University.

Career
Roberts became the chief aide to the Michigan House Taxation Committee in 1972. He later served as Director of the Michigan Senate Fiscal Agency. Roberts was appointed to the position of Michigan State Treasurer in January 1991. He served in this capacity until November 20, 1998, when he resigned. Chief deputy state treasurer Madhu Anderson became acting State Treasurer in his place. Roberts later served as Michigan State Treasurer from 2001 to 2002.

References

Living people
1947 births
Michigan State University alumni
Politicians from Washington, D.C.
State treasurers of Michigan
20th-century American politicians
21st-century American politicians